The 2013 Alberta Boston Pizza Cup, the men's provincial curling championship for Alberta, was held from February 6 to 10 at the Leduc Recreation Centre in Leduc, Alberta. The winner of the Boston Pizza Cup represented Alberta at the 2013 Tim Hortons Brier in Edmonton.

Qualification process

Twelve teams qualified for the provincial tournament through several methods. The qualification process is as follows:

Teams
The teams are listed as follows:

Knockout Draw Brackets
The draw is listed as follows:

A event

B event

C event

Knockout results
All draws are listed in Mountain Standard Time (UTC−7).

Draw 1
Wednesday, February 6, 9:30 am

Draw 2
Wednesday, February 6, 6:30 pm

Draw 3
Thursday, February 7, 9:00 am

Draw 4
Thursday, February 7, 2:00 pm

Draw 5
Thursday, February 7, 6:30 pm

Draw 6
Friday, February 8, 9:00 am

Draw 7
Friday, February 8, 2:00 pm

Draw 8
Friday, February 8, 6:30 pm

Draw 9
Saturday, February 9, 1:00 pm

Playoffs

1 vs. 2
Saturday, February 9, 6:30 pm

3 vs. 4
Saturday, February 9, 6:30 pm

Semifinal
Sunday, February 10, 9:30 am

Final
Sunday, February 10, 2:00 pm

References

External links

Boston Pizza Cup
Curling in Alberta
Leduc, Alberta
February 2013 sports events in Canada
2013 in Alberta